Urmet Uusorg (born 27 September 1976) is an Estonian athletics competitor.

He was born in Nõva, Lääne County. He has studied at Tallinn Pedagogical Institute's Faculty of Physical Education.

He began athletics training in 1990, coached by Peeter Kallas. He is multiple-time Estonian champion in different running disciplines. He has represented Estonian national athletics team 21 times.

Personal best:
 200 m: 21,85 (with wind 21,69)
 400 m: 47,08

References

Living people
1976 births
Estonian male sprinters
Tallinn University alumni
People from Lääne-Nigula Parish